The National Intelligence Meritorious Unit Citation (NIMUC) is an award of the National Intelligence Awards Program, for contributions to the United States Intelligence Community.  It may be "...awarded for the collective performance of a unit or group that has resulted in accomplishments of a clearly superior nature and of significant benefit to the Intelligence Community".

Criteria
The National Intelligence Meritorious Unit Citation recognizes single acts of meritorious service performed by an Intelligence Community team or organizational unit.  Emphasis is placed on those units with individuals from two or more Intelligence Community elements whose collective efforts for the Intelligence Community are notable and deserving of special recognition.  United States Government civilian, military, and contractor personnel are eligible for the National Intelligence Meritorious Unit Citation.  However the number of contractor personnel may not exceed 50% of the total number of US Government personnel nominated for the award.

Description
The National Intelligence Meritorious Unit Citation is awarded as a lapel pin for civilian wear, and a ribbon bar for military uniform wear.

It depicts an eight-point compass rose in a blue enamel disk superimposed over a heraldic rose. The rose is surrounded by a laurel wreath. It is made of Red brass with a 24 karat gold plated matte finish.

A 0.8mm stripe of white separates, a 0.8mm stripe of Old Glory Blue from a 4.0mm stripe of white. Next a 6.3mm stripe of Old Glory Blue is separated by a 1.6mm stripe of white from the 1.6mm center stripe of Golden Yellow.

See also
Awards and decorations of the United States government

References

Meritorious Unit Citation